Matias Zaldarriaga is an Argentinean cosmologist.

Life
Born in Coghlan neighbourhood, Buenos Aires, at the present time he works in the Institute for Advanced Study located in Princeton, New Jersey, United States. He is known especially for his work on the cosmic microwave background (CMB). 
Together with Uros Seljak, he developed the CMBFAST code, the first computationally efficient method for computing the anisotropy of the CMB for an arbitrary set of cosmological parameters. In 2018, he was elected a member of the National Academy of Sciences.

Awards
In 2003, he was awarded the Helen B. Warner Prize for Astronomy by the
American Astronomical Society, and in 2005 he won the Gribov Medal of the European Physical Society. In
2006, he was the recipient of a MacArthur Fellowship. In 2020, he was jointly awarded the Buchalter Cosmology Prize. Zaldarriaga was awarded the 2021 Gruber Prize in Cosmology jointly with Uroš Seljak and Marc Kamionkowski, who together "introduced numerous techniques for the study of the large-scale structure of the universe as well as the properties of its first instant of existence."

References

External links
 Faculty homepage at IAS
 "Modern Cosmology and the Origin of the Universe" - Matias Zaldarriaga, IAS, at Friends Forum, February 11, 2015, YouTube publication 19 January 2016

Living people
Year of birth missing (living people)
21st-century Argentine astronomers
Institute for Advanced Study faculty
MacArthur Fellows
Members of the United States National Academy of Sciences
Cosmologists